Allocnemis interrupta is a species of white-legged damselfly in the family Platycnemididae.

The IUCN conservation status of Allocnemis interrupta is "NT", near threatened. The species may be considered threatened in the near future. The IUCN status was reviewed in 2018.

References

Further reading

 

Platycnemididae
Articles created by Qbugbot
Insects described in 1984